Bay Area Quiz Kids is an academic quiz public-access television show for San Francisco Bay Area high schools. From the start in 1999 it has been hosted by Brad Friedman, the Drama Director at San Mateo High School.

Originally developed as Peninsula Quiz Kids by Bob Marks and Liz La Porte of Peninsula TV Cable 26 (Pen-TV) in 1999, the show began airing on KRON-4 in San Francisco as Bay Area Quiz Kids. The show is now a production of TV Game Brains, headed by Executive Producer Marc Balcer.

Throughout its run, the show has been sponsored by the San Mateo Credit Union.  Other sponsors have included Kaiser Permanente, SamTrans, the San Francisco Chronicle, AT&T, Oracle, Fisher Investments, and Wells Fargo Bank.

Format (until Season 11) 
Quiz Kids is played by two teams of three players each. The player in the center position is the team captain and is responsible for giving the team's answer on all non-toss-up questions. In early years the format varied somewhat from year to year. A face-off round of five questions from a single field in which one player from each team would answer questions was at one point used, but later dropped. The number of schools involved each year fluctuated from the original 16  up to about 40, but as schools grew discontent with bad judging and bad questions.

Season 11 (2010–11) 

Thirty-two teams competed in the 2010–2011 season with the members of the winning team receiving an all-expense-paid trip to Europe courtesy of ACIS.  In 2011–12 the competition saw 24 teams.  The runners-up receive a $1000 scholarship per student provided by Golden Gate Commandry No. 16, Knights Templar and Burlingame Bodies Ancient and Accepted Scottish Rite of Freemasonry.  ACIS withdrew as a sponsor for the 2012–13 year.

In the 2011–2012 season 24 teams competed in round one after a screening process at non-televised tournaments.  Several teams were inadvertently permitted a grandfather clause to play without screening, leading to a few problems.  Concerns arose because some of losing teams outperformed low-scoring winning teams by as much as 200 points.  As a result, an intermediary round was devised whereby the bottom four teams were dropped outright, and the remaining eight teams who had lost in round one played again, with the four winners advancing to the second round with all 12 original winners (regardless of score) to make a total of 16.  Round two featured 16 teams who played in eight single elimination matches.  The eight survivors were then staggered in a ladder tournament whereby the lower six teams contended for a shot to take on the number two seed (Harker School).  The winner of that match would play the number one seed, Bellarmine Prep for the championship.  Bellarmine Prep defeated the Menlo School (#3 seed) to win the 2011–2012 season.

Game play in 2011–2012 

The game is divided into four rounds. There are no point penalties for wrong answers at any point in the game.

 The game begins with a "Three for All round" in which the first part is a tossup open to all six players. The first player who buzzes in must answer without consulting his teammates. If the player is incorrect, the opposing team can consult before giving an answer. If a player answers correctly, his team earns 5 points and receives a second, related, collaboration 5 point question.  If the team answers that currently also it receives a third, related, collaboration 15 point question.  A clean sweep earned the team 25 points. The other team may not steal either bonus.
 In the Collaboration round, each team chooses one of three categories containing seven questions. Each correct answer earns 10 points; a team that answers all seven correct receives a 30-point bonus for a total of 100 points.
 The main Three for All round features three-part questions exactly like the first round except that the point totals increase to 10, 15, 25 respectively.  Correctly answering all three questions earns a team 50 points.
 In the final Countdown round, teams have three minutes to answer tossup questions worth 30 points each.  As in the Three for All round, if a player misses a tossup question, the opposing team can consult before answering.

History 
BAAL President Gaius Stern worked with the show as a writer and consultant from 2001 to 2003. BAAL Vice President Ross Ritterman served as question writer/editor and show consultant Season 6 through Season 9. In Seasons 8, question material was provided by NAQT and in Season 13 by both NAQT and BAAL.

In some years (2001–2003, 2004–2008, 2010–2012) the Bay Area Academic League (BAAL) has participated in writing the questions and judging the matches. BAAL has organized San Francisco Area High School Quizbowl events since 1995. BAAL was originally an arm of the University of California-Berkeley Quiz Bowl club, until 2001.

The show underwent difficulties from 2008 to 2010, leading many schools to withdraw. A change of leadership in 2010 brought about many reforms.

In 2010 the show underwent a major redesign, under new producer Marc Balcer. Balcer introduced the "Three for All" format and redesigned the set and graphics. In response to many complaints over bad judging, bad questions, and in an effort to improve the integrity of the show, Balcer brought back BAAL president and UC Berkeley classics professor Gaius Stern as editor and judge. In 2013, Jeff Hoppes took over as question writer and judge.  Jeff also runs the Northern California Quiz Bowl Alliance.

Topics
 History
 Literature/Language Arts
 Math
 Science
 Geography
 Fine/Performing Arts
 Sports
 Current News Events

2008 season
Round One

 Bentley def. Terra Nova (500–140)
 Crystal Springs def. Aragon (380–120)
 Mountain View def. Campolindo (540–170)
 San Mateo def. Menlo Atherton (410–230)
 Clayton Valley def. Sacred Heart (340–290)
 Westmoor def. South San Francisco (380–360)
 Capuchino def. Gilroy (350–80)
 Mission San Jose def. Gunn (390–370)
 Mills def. Half Moon Bay  (420–70)
 Bellarmine def. Castro  Valley (420–300)
 Harker def. Evergreen Valley (500–90)
 Menlo School def. San Leandro (350–240)
 Homestead def. Riordan (510–150)
 Hillsdale def. Woodside (190–170)

Season 11 (2009–2010)
Round One

 Bellarmine def. Mountain View (560–510)
 Concord def. Terra Nova (260–100)
 Harker def. Archbishop Riordan (450–190)
 Menlo School def. Carlmont (410–120)
 San Mateo def. Westmoor (580–340)
 Mills def. Woodside (450–200)
 Mountain View (Wild Card) def. Menlo-Atherton (570–410)
 Hillsdale def. Gunn (420–300)

Winners

 2000: Menlo-Atherton
 2001: Menlo-Atherton
 2002: Menlo-Atherton
 2003: Menlo-Atherton
 2004: Half Moon Bay
 2005: Mission San Jose
 2006: Bentley
 2007: Sacred Heart
 2008: San Mateo
 2009: Bellarmine
 2010: Mission San Jose
 2011: Bellarmine
 2012: Bellarmine
 2013: Bellarmine
 2014: Bellarmine
 2015: Mission San Jose

Participating high schools

 Archbishop Riordan
 Bellarmine
 Bentley
 Carlmont High School
 Castro Valley
 Concord High School
 Crystal Springs Uplands School
 Gunn High School
 Harker School
 Hillsdale High School
 Jefferson
 Lynnbrook
 Menlo School
 Menlo-Atherton High School
 Mills High School
 Mission San Jose High School (dropped out 2011, returning 2013)
 Mountain View
 Pinewood
 Sacred Heart
 San Mateo High School
 San Leandro High School
 Sequoia
 Serra
 Stuart Hall High School
 South San Francisco
 Summit
 Terra Nova High School (Pacifica)
 Westmoor  
 Woodside

Past Participants 

 Acalanes  
 Aragon High School   
 Burlingame High School - 2008 season
 Campolindo   
 Capuchino High School  
 Carondolet  
 Clayton Valley  
 De La Salle 
 Evergreen Valley  
 Gilroy  
 Half Moon Bay  
 Miramonte  
 Monta Vista  
 Novato  
 Palo Alto High School 
 Pescadero 
 San Carlos 
 Tamalpais 
 Valley Christian  
 Vintage  
 Willow Glen

Notes

External links
  BAAL website
 Official Website
 KRON-4 Quiz Kids
 "Monta Vista Crushes Harker"
 Northern California Quiz Bowl Alliance

American public access television shows
Education in the San Francisco Bay Area
Television in the San Francisco Bay Area
Student quiz television series